J. Barry Stout (November 7, 1936 – October 29, 2016) was a Democratic politician and former member of the Pennsylvania State Senate who represented the 46th District after winning a special election in May 1977. He represented his district from June 7, 1977 through 2010. 

Previously he was a member of the Pennsylvania House of Representatives from 1970 through 1976.

Biography

On October 22, 2004 PennDOT dedicated the "J. Barry Stout Park and Ride" off the "Beau Street" exit of I-70 in South Strabane Township. Constructed by Greensburg-based Donegal Construction at a cost of $1.2 million, the lighted park and ride lot has 211 spaces and 7 handicapped-accessible spaces. Stout initially suggested the location of the park and ride lot after learning that PennDOT owned the land, which is ideally situated near I-70, I-79, and Route 19.

Stout has credited former Lieutenant Governor of Pennsylvania Ernie Kline with facilitating his election to the Pennsylvania State Senate in 1977.

Death
Stout died at the age of seventy-nine on October 29, 2016.

References

External links
Project Vote Smart – Senator J. Barry Stout (PA) profile
Follow the Money – J Barry Stout
2006 2004 2002 2000 1998 campaign contributions

1936 births
2016 deaths
People from Bentleyville, Pennsylvania
American Presbyterians
Democratic Party Pennsylvania state senators
Democratic Party members of the Pennsylvania House of Representatives
Washington & Jefferson College alumni